The Navy SEALs are the U.S. Navy's primary special operations force.

Navy SEALs may also refer to:

 Navy SEALs (film), a 1990 American military action film
 Navy SEALS (video game), a 1990 video game based on the 1990 film
 Navy Seals: Battle for New Orleans, a 2015 American action horror film
 Underwater Demolition Assault Unit, a Thai special operations force unit colloquially known as Royal Thai Navy Seals

See also
 SEAL (disambiguation)
 Seals (disambiguation)